Peter Oxenbridge Thacher (1752–1802) was a Congregationalist minister in Massachusetts.

Biography

Peter Thacher was born in Milton, Massachusetts on March 21, 1752. He served as pastor in Malden of the First Church (1770–1784) and in Boston of the Brattle Street Church (1785–1802). He actively supported the American Revolution.

He participated in the drafting of the Massachusetts Constitution in 1780. In 1794, he was elected a Fellow of the American Academy of Arts and Sciences. He belonged to the Massachusetts Historical Society and Massachusetts Humane Society. He was educated at Harvard College, 1765–1769. On October 8, 1770, he married Elizabeth Poole (Hawkes); they had ten children.

Peter Thacher died in Savannah, Georgia on December 16, 1802.

Notes

References

Further reading
 

1752 births
1802 deaths
Clergy from Boston
18th century in Boston
Clergy in the American Revolution
Fellows of the American Academy of Arts and Sciences
Harvard University alumni
American Congregationalist ministers